Wyndham Capital Mortgage Inc. is a mortgage company based in Charlotte, North Carolina, providing residential mortgage loans through a direct-to-consumer, online lending model.

Overview

Wyndham Capital’s is a fintech mortgage lender that utilizes online technology to serve its customers and loan officers. However, unlike a number of other lenders that use online technology, Wyndham Capital processes, underwrites, closes, and funds all of its loans internally. The loan process is paperless, through an encrypted secure loan portal with e-signature technology which helps to streamline the loan process.

Wyndham Capital is one of only 11 LendingTree Certified Lenders Nationwide. It's also the only lender on LendingTree's network with 100% of its Professional Mortgage Consultants certified.

The company has Professional Mortgage Consultants licensed in Alabama, Arizona, California, Colorado, Connecticut, Washington D.C., Florida, Georgia, Kansas, Illinois, Indiana, Maine, Maryland, Michigan, Minnesota, New Hampshire, New Jersey, North Carolina, Ohio, Oklahoma, Oregon, Pennsylvania, Rhode Island, South Carolina, Tennessee, Texas, Virginia, Washington, and West Virginia.

History

The founder Jeff Douglas had the idea for this company while working as an account manager at LendingTree from May 2000 to March 2001. During that period, the online mortgage business was growing exponentially, and he saw an opportunity in this business to combine industry leading rates and fees with the level of service expected from a neighborhood lender. In launching Wyndham, Douglas adopted an aggressive strategy of offering interest rates below those of other lenders, reasoning that the company could make up the difference by facilitating a higher volume of loans. In 2002, the company became part of LendingTree's network of lenders, where it became one of the Top 20 lenders. In 2004, the company started to invest in an automation process, creating a completely paperless workflow by the year 2005. This helped to minimize its environmental footprint and create a better efficiency for loan transactions.

In 2008, the company changed its business model from a mortgage broker to a fully operational mortgage banking center that would process, underwrite, close, and fund all of its loans internally. The change proved successful and the company managed to grow considerably during a slow market period (429% growth in the years 2009 - 2012, from $8.4 million revenue to $44.4 million). Jeremy Abig, the CFO who redefined the business model, won the 2012 Small Private Company CFO Award with the Charlotte Business Journal.

Ratings and awards
Wyndham Capital Mortgage is rated A+ (maximum rating) by Better Business Bureau. In 2013, it ranked #66 in the Inc. 5000 top fastest-growing US financial services companies and #23 in the top fastest growing North Carolina companies.

The company won the 2011, 2012, and 2013 Top Tech Savvy Lender Award and the 2012 Green Lender Award with Mortgage Technology Magazine for the successful adoption of automation and the environmental focus of the company. It also won the 2010, 2012, and 2015 Best Places to Work Award with the Charlotte Business Journal. In 2015, The Charlotte Observer named Wyndham Capital the #1 Top Best Place to Work among midsize companies in the Queen City.

References

External links
 

Mortgage lenders of the United States
2001 establishments in the United States
Banks based in North Carolina
Companies based in Charlotte, North Carolina
Financial services companies established in 2001